Ramón Sender Barayón (born October 29, 1934) is a composer, visual artist and writer.  He was the co-founder with Morton Subotnick of the San Francisco Tape Music Center in 1962. He is the son of Spanish writer Ramón J. Sender.

Education
Sender was born in Madrid, Spain, and left the country during the civil war following the Fascist coup there in 1936. He studied piano with George Copeland, harmony with Elliott Carter, and counterpoint and fugue with Harold Shapero (1948–1951). Sender attended the Conservatorio di Santa Cecilia in Rome and Columbia University in New York, where he studied with Henry Cowell.  He also studied with Robert Erickson at the San Francisco Conservatory of Music (1959–1962) and at Mills College, where he studied with Darius Milhaud. Sender holds a Bachelor of Music degree from the San Francisco Conservatory of Music and an M.A. from Mills College.

San Francisco Tape Music Center
Sender co-founded the San Francisco Tape Music Center in 1962 with Morton Subotnick and also collaborated with composers and visual artists including Pauline Oliveros, Tony Martin, Joseph Byrd, Terry Riley, William Maginnis, and many others until 1966 when the Center was incorporated into Mills College.  It was later named the Mills Center for Contemporary Music and continues to function today.

Sender participated with Don Buchla and Morton Subotnick in the design of the Buchla Box, one of the first music synthesizers.

Morningstar and Wheeler Ranches

In January 1966, he co-produced the Trips Festival with Ken Kesey and Stewart Brand. It was a three-day event that, in conjunction with The Merry Pranksters, brought together the nascent hippie movement for the first time.

In April 1966, Sender became the first resident at Lou Gottlieb's Morning Star Ranch (Sender has, at times, referred to himself as Ramon Sender Morningstar) open land commune, which evolved into a Digger Farm / open land commune in 1967.  After the residents' homes were bulldozed by Sonoma County authorities three times, he moved into the Wheeler Ranch in Occidental, California. Currently both properties have reverted to private ownership. Sender continued living and working in the area until 1980 when he returned to San Francisco. As "His Imperial Nothingness, Zero the Clown," he has continued appearing in the annual Occidental Fools Parade.

One of the residents at Wheeler at Ranch was Alicia Bay Laurel, a visual artist, author and singer-songwriter known for her 1970 best-seller Living on the Earth.  He collaborated with her on another book, Being of the Sun, which contains information about homemade music, drones, modes, and open tunings as a means of spiritual growth, as well as information about yoga, creating ritual, and forming intentional communities. In 1973, Sender made a reel-to-reel recording of himself and Laurel performing songs, chants and improvisations from the book, which Laurel released in 2013 as a CD on her record label, Indigo With Stars, titled Songs from Being of the Sun.

During the late 1970s, Sender was one of the founding members of The Occidental Community Choir (the nearest town to the Wheeler Ranch commune), for whom he wrote original music and shared his skills as a choral arranger. The choir's rendition of Sender's arrangement of Laurel's song, "In the Morning" appears on her CD, Music from Living on the Earth.

In 2006, stage producer, arranger and bassist Nicholas Alva created a musical based on the story of the open land communes Morningstar and Wheeler Ranch, including songs by Sender. In 2020 the music and dialogue were recorded and released as an ebook.

Sender co-curated "The Hippies," an exhibition re-telling in written narration, photography, art and memorabilia, the history of the west Sonoma County Open Land communes, at the West County Museum in Sebastopol, California (part of the Sonoma County Historical Society.) Running from October 30, 2016 to March 5, 2017, it was the most popular exhibition ever at the West County Museum.

Later Years in San Francisco

In 1980, Sender returned to San Francisco where he married his long-time friend Judith Levy-Sender, who taught in the San Francisco School District for thirty years. A poet and self-taught artist, he helped her publish two books of poems and artwork, the last titled "Transitions Visible and Invisible." Collaborating with her, they founded the Odd Mondays speaker series that they ran for eighteen years before turning it over to a new producer.

Sender is also a visual artist whose visual works are sampled on his web site and in a 2009 book, Barayon, a Catalog of Prints, Drawings, Original Art.  The book is based on a one-man show at the Gallery Sanchez in 2008.

After the death of Sender's daughter Xaverie in 1989, he founded the Peregrine Foundation (for people "living in or exiting from experimental social groups"). He was the administrator of the foundation until 1999 and published four full-length autobiographies of women who had left the Bruderhof community in a series titled "Women from Utopia."

Sender identifies himself as a "transcendental, post-monotheist hippie pagan sun worshipper, with one foot planted in the nondual teaching of Julie Henderson and the other in the Archaic Revival culture".

In 2018, Spanish documentary filmmaker Luis Olano released Sender Barayón Un Viaje Hacia La Luz (A Trip into the Light), a film about the life and works of Ramón Sender Barayón, including interviews with Sender at his home in San Francisco, archival photos and footage, and recordings of Sender's music.  The film has English subtitles whenever Spanish is spoken, and Spanish subtitles whenever English is spoken, and has been screened in the USA and in Spain. Link to the film's trailer:"

Ramón Sender Barayón has four children: Xaverie Rhodes (deceased), Jonathan Sender, Andrés Sender and Sol Sender, four grandchildren: Gareth Rhodes, Dorie McKernan, David Sender, Rafael Sender, and Oliver Benjamin Sender, and two great-grandchildren: Claire McKernan and Garrett McKernan.

Writings
To distinguish himself from his father Ramón J. Sender, a well-known Spanish novelist, he uses the Spanish-style name Ramón Sender Barayón.  This is also to honor his late mother Amparo Barayón.

Sender's novel Zero Weather was published in 1980.  He has several other unpublished manuscripts and some of his short stories are published on the internet.

In 1989, Sender published A Death in Zamora, a book investigating the execution of his mother by Franco's forces during the Spanish Civil War. The book has been recognized not only as a valuable record of the Spanish Civil War, but as a historical account of early feminism and rebellion against patriarchy in Spain, of which his mother, Amparo Barayón, was a pioneer. An updated edition (2018), based on the Spanish Post-Metropolis Editorial 2017 edition, contains essays by renowned Spanish Civil War historians Paul Preston, Helen Graham and Francisco Espinosa Maestre. His cousin Medcedes Esteban Maes-Kemp assisted as translator.

Recently, he published an anthology of his short stories and essays, titled A Planetary Sojourn. He also wrote a novel based on his experiences at the Tape Music Center, entitled Naked Close Up, which was published in 2012 as an ebook by Intelligent Arts Publishing, a project of The Electronic Music Foundation in Albany, New York.

Music
"Donkey Gruntler Serenade", audience participation on Donkey Gruntlers with pre-recorded tape – 2003 live quartet performance by Luciano Chessa and friends
"Aidan's Gamelan (in memory of Lou Harrison)", audience participation on tuned water drums with pre-recorded tape – 2003
"Seashore Snake Sizzle," audience participation on rattles with pre-recorded tape – 2003
"Audition" for two open-tuned autoharps and dalruba – 1982
"Great-Grandpa Lemuel's Death-Rattle What-In-Tarnation Reincarnation Blues", dixieland band, accordion, tape – 1981
"A Tewa Prayer", mixed chorus – 1978
"I Have a Dream", mixed chorus – 1978
Loopy Gamelan "Oh 'C' Can You Say", for Oakland Children's Chorus – 1976
Loopy Gamelans on 'A' and 'B' for four performers – 1976
"64 I Ching Chants" (instructions) – 1976
"Outdoor Music for four Open-tuned Autoharps" – 1970
"Enoughing," tape – 1968; "Ushas", tape – 1968; "Xmas Me", tape – 1968
"In the Garden", clarinet, viola, projections and tape – 1965
"Desert Ambulance", amplified accordion, voice, 3-track tape, projections – 1964
"Balances", amplified str qt (with db) – 1964
"Tropical Fish Opera", four instruments – 1962
"Time Fields", sextet – 1962 (Pacifica Directors Award, 1963)
"Traversals", tape – 1961
"Kronos", tape composition (approx 15 minutes) – 1962
"Kore", tape – 1961
"Four Sanskrit Hymns", four singers, four cellos, double bass, harp, piano, celesta, three percussionists, tape – 1961

Recordings
 Various works included on the DVD published with the book in David Bernstein's The San Francisco Tape Music Center: 1960s counterculture and the avant-garde,  (2008, University of California Press)
Desert Ambulance (2005, Locust 70)
Worldfood (2004, Locust 55)
Music from Mills, an anthology which contains a short excerpt from his "Audition" (1986, Mills MC 001)
Songs from Being of the Sun remastered archival (1973) reel-to-reel recordings of Ramón Sender Barayón and Alicia Bay Laurel performing songs, chants and improvisations from their book, Being of the Sun. (Indigo With Stars, 2013)

Books
Home Free Home - a History of Morning Star and Wheeler Communes (2018)
Morning Star and Wheeler's Open Land Communes - A Brief Run-Through (2018)
Naked Close Up (2012)
Planetary Sojourn (2010)
Catalog of Prints, Drawings, Original Art (2009)
A Death in Zamora (1989) New edition (2019)
The Guide to Everwhere (1988), sample on the Apple Learning Disc, a hypertext CD-ROM
Being of the Sun (1973) with Alicia Bay Laurel
Zero Weather (1980)
Zero Summer (1984)
The Morning Star Scrapbook (1976)

References

External links
Personal web site
Peregrine Foundation
San Francisco Conservatory of Music Oral History Interview with Ramon Sender

20th-century classical composers
21st-century classical composers
American male classical composers
American classical composers
American artists
1934 births
Living people
Pupils of Robert Erickson
Pupils of Darius Milhaud
American male writers
21st-century American composers
People from Occidental, California
20th-century American composers
Locust Music artists